The Tunney Act, officially known as the Antitrust Procedures and Penalties Act, is antitrust legislation passed in the United States in 1974.

Submitted by John V. Tunney, the law has as its main point the court review Justice Department decisions regarding mergers and acquisitions. It has been referred to in the AT&T actions with regards to SBC and BellSouth, along with the acquisition of Sprint by T-Mobile proposed in 2018.

References

 https://www.law.cornell.edu/uscode/text/15/16

1974 in law
93rd United States Congress
United States federal antitrust legislation